In enzymology, a glutamate N-acetyltransferase is an enzyme that catalyzes the chemical reaction

N2-acetyl-L-ornithine + L-glutamate  L-ornithine + N-acetyl-L-glutamate

Thus, the two substrates of this enzyme are N2-acetyl-L-ornithine and L-glutamate, whereas its two products are L-ornithine and N-acetyl-L-glutamate.

This enzyme belongs to the family of transferases, specifically those acyltransferases transferring groups other than aminoacyl groups.  The systematic name of this enzyme class is N2-acetyl-L-ornithine:L-glutamate N-acetyltransferase. Other names in common use include ornithine transacetylase, alpha-N-acetyl-L-ornithine:L-glutamate N-acetyltransferase, acetylglutamate synthetase, acetylglutamate-acetylornithine transacetylase, acetylglutamic synthetase, acetylglutamic-acetylornithine transacetylase, acetylornithinase, acetylornithine glutamate acetyltransferase, glutamate acetyltransferase, N-acetyl-L-glutamate synthetase, N-acetylglutamate synthase, N-acetylglutamate synthetase, ornithine acetyltransferase, and 2-N-acetyl-L-ornithine:L-glutamate N-acetyltransferase.  This enzyme participates in urea cycle and metabolism of amino groups.

Structural studies

References

 

EC 2.3.1
Enzymes of known structure